Caleb J. Moore was an American politician in the state of Washington. He served in the Washington House of Representatives.

References

Year of birth missing
Year of death missing
Democratic Party members of the Washington House of Representatives